In the Babylon 5 fictional universe, a technomage is a member of a secret organization that uses technology to create effects traditionally associated with magic.

Technomage may also refer to:

 Technomage (video game), a 2001 video game developed and published by Sunflowers for the PlayStation and Windows

See also
 Mage (disambiguation)
 Technomancer (disambiguation)